Article 7-C of the New York Multiple Dwelling Law, commonly known as the 1982 Loft Law, was designed to protect the residential tenants of certain former commercial buildings in New York City from substandard conditions, eviction, and unfair rent increases. The law affected buildings it defined as Interim Multiple Dwellings (IMDs), commercial or manufacturing loft buildings that had at least three units occupied by residents during the period of April 1, 1980, through December 1, 1981. It required landlords to bring converted residences up to code, and prevented them from charging tenants for improvements until the issuance of a Certificate of Occupancy. The law was administered by the New York City Loft Board.

The 1982 Loft Law should not be confused with the artists' loft law, Article 7-b of the New York State Multiple Dwelling Law nor with 
rent control legislation, which limits the ability of landlords to increase the rent of certain long-term tenants.  The artists' loft law requires that the tenant be certified by either the New York State council on the arts or the city's department of cultural affairs.  While this law applied to any city of at least one million in New York State, only New York City has such population.

See also
Rent control in New York
2009 Loft Law Amendment

References

External links
Lower Manhattan Loft Tenants , an advocacy group
New York City Loft Board
tenant.net homepage, an exhaustive resource for NYC housing law and tenants rights

Loft Law
Loft Law
1982 in New York (state)
New York City Department of Buildings
New York City law
Housing in New York City